The 1981 Illinois State Redbirds football team was an American football team that represented Illinois State University as a member of the Missouri Valley Conference (MVC) during the 1981 NCAA Division I-A football season. In their first year under head coach Bob Otolski, the Redbirds compiled an overall record of 3–7 with a mark of 0–5 in confernece play, placing last uot of eight teams in the MVC. Illinois State played home games at Hancock Stadium in Normal, Illinois.

Schedule

References

Illinois State
Illinois State Redbirds football seasons
Illinois State Redbirds football